The 1946–47 season was the 44th season of competitive football in Belgium. RSC Anderlechtois won their first Premier Division title. At the end of the season, several teams were relegated at all levels in order to decrease the number of teams in all divisions to 16. The Belgium national football team played 4 friendly games and had only one win, against Scotland.

Overview
At the end of the season, 5 clubs (RCS La Forestoise, R White Star AC, SC Eendracht Aalst, Sint-Niklaas SK and RFC Brugeois) were relegated to Division I, while R Uccle Sport (Division I A winner) and R Charleroi SC (Division I B winner) were promoted to Premier Division.

No fewer than 7 clubs were relegated from Division I to Promotion: Vilvorde FC, CS Schaerbeek, RU Hutoise FC, CS Hallois, RC Lokeren, ASV Oostende KM, Cappellen FC, SC Menen, Oude God Sport, to be replaced by FC Winterslag, Gosselies Sports, RFC Bressoux and SK Roeselare.

National team

* Belgium score given first

Key
 H = Home match
 A = Away match
 N = On neutral ground
 F = Friendly
 o.g. = own goal

Honours

Final league tables

Premier Division

Top scorer: Jef Mermans (RSC Anderlechtois) with 38 goals.

References